I. juncea may refer to:

 Iris juncea, a smooth-bulbed bulbous iris
 Isotropis juncea, a plant endemic to Australia